Gareth Morrison (born 6 December 1981) is Scottish actor, screenwriter and film producer. Morrison appears primarily in horror, thriller and dramatic movies. He is known for his role as a student-demonstrator in TV series Taggart and for playing the sniper Potrovsky in a horror movie Outpost: Rise of the Spetsnaz.

Biography 
Morrison was born in the Scottish city of Edinburgh.

Early in his career, Morrison played a minor role in episode "Cause to Kill" in the TV series Taggart in 2005. Morrison again linked up with Taggart creator Glenn Chandler eight years later, playing Peter Sutcliffe in Chandler's controversial stage play, Killers.

More recently, Morrison co-wrote and starred in the horror short Bed and Breakfast, which earned positive reviews including praise as "polished" and "enjoyable" by WeAreIndieHorror.com. His dramatic skills were also utilized in Harder, an educational film used in a Medics Against Violence and the Scottish Government joint program to help professionals recognize signs of domestic abuse.

Throughout his career, Morrison has acted in more than 18 movies.

Education 
 Perth High School

Filmography

As an actor 
2018    "Tran Set "         Keith

As producer

See also 
 Gareth Morris – British flautist
 Garth Morrison – Chief Scout

References

External links 
 
 

Living people
21st-century Scottish male actors
Male actors from Edinburgh
Scottish male film actors
1981 births